John Adkins may refer to:
 John Scudder Adkins (1872–1931), American architect
 John Rainey Adkins (1941–1989), American guitarist and songwriter

See also
 John Atkins (disambiguation)
 Jon Adkins (born 1977), American baseball pitcher